Ethusidae is one of two extant families of crabs in the superfamily Dorippoidea. It contains four genera. Members of this family are found in marine environments at depths from 16m to 4,192m.

Genera
Ethusa Roux, 1830
Ethusina Smith, 1884
Parethusa Chen, 1997
Serpenthusa Naruse, Castro & Ng, 2009

References

Ng, Guinot & Davie (2008). Systema Brachyurorum: Part I. An annotated checklist of extant brachyuran crabs of the world. Raffles Bulletin of Zoology Supplement, n. 17 .

Crabs
Decapod families